Gelechia mediterranea is a moth of the family Gelechiidae. It is found in France, Spain and Greece, as well as on Sardinia and Crete.

The larvae possibly feed on Acer species.

References

Moths described in 1991
Gelechia